Formal Aspects of Computing (FAOC) is a peer-reviewed scientific journal published by Springer Science+Business Media, covering the area of formal methods and associated topics in computer science. The editors-in-chief are Jim Woodcock and Cliff Jones. The journal is associated with BCS-FACS, the British Computer Society Formal Aspects of Computing Science Specialist Group. According to the Journal Citation Reports, the journal has a 2010 impact factor of 1.170.

See also
 Acta Informatica
 Innovations in Systems and Software Engineering

References

External links
 

Publications established in 1989
Computer science journals
Formal methods publications
British Computer Society
Springer Science+Business Media academic journals
Quarterly journals
English-language journals